Herzfeld is a German surname. Notable people with the surname include:

Avraham Herzfeld (1891–1973), Zionist activist and Israeli politician
Charles M. Herzfeld (b. 1925), American scientist
Ernst Herzfeld (1879–1948), German archaeologist and Iranologist
Estella Herzfeld (1837–1881), Dutch poet
Guido Herzfeld (1851–1923), German actor
Helmut Herzfeld or John Heartfield (1891–1968), German photomontage artist
Ida of Herzfeld (c. 788 – c. 813), widow of a Saxon duke who devoted her life to the poor following the death of her husband in 811
Jacob Herzfeld (1762–1826), German actor and theatre director
Jim Herzfeld, American film and television screenwriter
John Herzfeld, American motion picture and television director, screenwriter, actor and producer
Judith Herzfeld (b. 1948), American biophysical chemist
Karl Herzfeld (1892–1978), Austrian-American physicist
Levi Herzfeld (1810–1884), German rabbi and historian.
Shmuel Herzfeld (b. 1974), American Modern Orthodox rabbi who heads the National Synagogue of Washington DC
Thomas J. Herzfeld (b. 1945), American businessman
Victor von Herzfeld (1856-1919), Hungarian violinist and composer.

See also
Wieland Herzfelde (1896–1988), German publisher and writer
Reuben Herzfeld House, historic house in Alexander City, Alabama named after German immigrant Reuben Herzfeld

German-language surnames